"All My Life" is a song written by Dave Robbins, Jeff Silbar, and Van Stephenson, and recorded by American country music artist Kenny Rogers.  It was released in April 1983 as the second single from the album We've Got Tonight.  The song reached number 37 on the Billboard Hot 100 chart in mid-1983.  The song peaked at number 13 on the country chart and went to #2 on the AC charts.

Chart performance

References

1983 singles
1983 songs
Kenny Rogers songs
Song recordings produced by David Foster
Songs written by Van Stephenson
Liberty Records singles
Songs written by Jeff Silbar
Songs written by Dave Robbins (keyboardist)